VA-85 may refer to:

 VA-85 (U.S. Navy), a U.S. Navy attack squadron 1948-1949
 Second VA-85 (U.S. Navy), a U.S. Navy attack squadron 1953-1994
 Virginia State Route 85 (disambiguation)